My New Sassy Girl is a 2016 South Korean-Chinese romantic comedy film directed by Joh Keun-shik, and starring Cha Tae-hyun and Victoria Song. This film, a sequel to My Sassy Girl (2001), was released in China on April 22, 2016 and released in South Korea on May 12, 2016.

Plot
Gyun-woo is having difficulty forgetting The Girl of My Sassy Girl (2001) since she decides to leave him and take refuge as a Buddhist. He then reunites with his childhood sweetheart Sassy, an elementary school classmate from China who was often teased because of her broken Korean. They manage to get married despite an initial opposition from Gyun-woo's mother. Unbeknownst to Gyun-woo, his wife sends in his job application to a telecommunication company in China. Somehow he and another fellow Korean, Yong-sub, are recruited by the company and are assigned to Team Oxford, which they later found out is meant for recruits selected by the company Chairman's bull dog named Oxford. Sometime later Team Oxford is disbanded, his Korean colleague is fired and Gyun-woo is assigned to do degrading tasks for the company's Executive Director Kim. While trying to keep his wife happy, he does not let her know his employment status. But when his wife learns of it, she confronts the Executive Director at his home during a party, and things go out of hand as she kicks him into the swimming pool. As a result of the turn of events, Gyun-woo has to leave the company and his relationship with his wife is strained, forcing them to separate. As he is about to leave the company with his things, a female colleague whom he befriended, Yuko, tells him how his wife defended him in front of the Executive Director. After going home to find his wife not there and recalling the happy times they had together, he decides to go and find her. His tough journey through mountain trails in China is finally rewarded when he finds her on the plains with her grandfather and other villagers herding livestock on horseback. Both of them reconcile and later have children of their own. The movie ends with the family receiving a phone call from The Girl telling them that she is coming back to normal life and finding Gyun-woo.

Cast
Cha Tae-hyun as Gyun-woo
Victoria Song as Sassy
Bae Seong-woo as Yong-sub
Mina Fujii as Yuko
Choi Jin-ho as Executive Director Kim
Song Ok-suk as Gyun-woo's mother

Production

Boxoffice

References

External links

2016 multilingual films
2016 romantic comedy films
Chinese romantic comedy films
Chinese sequel films
South Korean romantic comedy films
South Korean sequel films
Chinese multilingual films
South Korean multilingual films
2016 comedy films
2010s South Korean films